The Four-Season Bathhouse in the Iranian city Arak dates back to the Qajar period, and had two separate sections for ladies and gents. The tile-work of the clock room and spinal designed columns of this area, including the layout of the bath are interesting features. The structure was renovated into a museum after undergoing necessary repairs.

The Four Seasons Bathhouse in Arak was the largest bathhouse in Iran. This bathhouse was built in the late Qajar (Ahmad Shah) by Haji Muhammad Ibrahim khansari. A variety of decorated tiles in the building display designs of humans, animals, and plants. Drawings and paintings of the four seasons of the year in the four corners of the bathroom is the reason for its name. The bathroom is the only bathroom where a separate part is devoted to religious minorities. Four Seasons Bathroom is recorded in the National Heritage List.

References

https://sites.google.com/view/startpagina-onderwerpen/promotie/meubels/badkamermeubels

External links

 en.rasekhoon.net 

World Heritage Sites in Iran
Bathrooms
Museums in Iran
Architecture in Iran
Arak, Iran
Markazi Province
Landscape design history
Buildings and structures in Markazi Province
Tourist attractions in Markazi Province
Public baths in Iran